The United States Penitentiary, Pollock (USP Pollock) is a high-security United States federal prison for male inmates in unincorporated Grant Parish, Louisiana. It is part of the Pollock Federal Correctional Complex (FCC Pollock) and operated by the Federal Bureau of Prisons, a division of the United States Department of Justice. The facility also has an adjacent satellite prison camp for minimum-security male offenders.

FCC Pollock is located in central Louisiana, approximately 15 miles north of Alexandria.

Notable incidents

2006 escape
On April 5, 2006, convicted murderer Richard Lee McNair escaped from USP Pollock. McNair's duties in prison included work in a manufacturing area, where he repaired old, torn mailbags. He held this position for several months, during which he plotted his escape. McNair escaped by constructing an "escape pod," which included a breathing tube, and burying it under a pile of outgoing mailbags. At approximately 9:45 AM, prison staff placed the mailbags on a pallet, transported it to a nearby warehouse outside the prison's perimeter fence, and went for lunch. McNair then cut himself out of the pod and escaped at 11:00 AM. Having observed prison operations and the times when prisoner counts were conducted, McNair knew that his absence would not be discovered until 4:00 PM. After an over yearlong manhunt, McNair was captured in New Brunswick, Canada by the Royal Canadian Mounted Police on Oct. 25, 2007 after being featured on the television program America's Most Wanted. Since McNair had previously escaped from a county jail and a state prison in North Dakota in 1987 and 1992, he was classified as a high-escape risk and transferred to the United States Penitentiary, Florence ADX, the federal supermax prison in Colorado which holds inmates requiring the tightest controls.

2007 inmate murder
In November 2007, inmate William Anthony Bullock was stabbed to death with a shank during an altercation with another inmate, identified as Shaun Wayne Williams. Williams had crafted the shank from a part of a cell locker. Williams, who was serving a 96-month sentence for being a felon in possession of a firearm, was convicted of voluntary manslaughter in 2009 and sentenced to an additional 15 years in prison. Williams is currently incarcerated at USP Big Sandy and scheduled to be released on January 21, 2023.

Inmate Steven Prater, who was serving a 51-month sentence for being a felon in possession of a firearm, was fatally injured during a fight with another inmate on June 24, 2010. On January 18, 2010, inmate Carlton Coltrane was stabbed to death by another inmate. Coltrane's mother told The Washington Post that her son, who was serving a sentence for bank robbery, told her several days before that there were running disputes between gangs of inmates from Louisiana and the Washington, DC area. The murders of Prater and Coltrane remain under investigation.

Notable Inmates

Current

Former

See also

List of U.S. federal prisons
Federal Bureau of Prisons
Incarceration in the United States

References

External links
 Bureau of Prisons website
 Satellite image of USP, Pollock

Pollock
Buildings and structures in Grant Parish, Louisiana
Prisons in Louisiana